The Kearny School District is a public school district that provides public education for students in pre-kindergarten through twelfth grade from the Town of Kearny, in Hudson County, New Jersey, United States.

As of the 2020–21 school year, the district, comprised of seven schools, had an enrollment of 5,251 students and 446.6 classroom teachers (on an FTE basis), for a student–teacher ratio of 11.8:1.

The district is classified by the New Jersey Department of Education as being in District Factor Group "B", the second lowest of eight groupings. District Factor Groups organize districts statewide to allow comparison by common socioeconomic characteristics of the local districts. From lowest socioeconomic status to highest, the categories are A, B, CD, DE, FG, GH, I and J.

Schools 
Schools in the district (with 2020–21 enrollment data from the National Center for Education Statistics) are:

Elementary schools
Franklin Elementary School with 862 students in grades PreK-6 
Yvonne Cali, Principal
Garfield Elementary School with 463 students in grades PreK-6
Donna Masters, Principal
Roosevelt Elementary School with 379 students in grades PreK-6
Antonio Moyano, Principal
Schuyler Elementary School with 430 students in grades PreK-6
Valerie Iacono, Principal
Washington Elementary School with 474 students in grades PreK-6
Jon Zimmerman, Principal

Middle school
Lincoln Middle School with 807 students in grades 7-8
Curtis Brack, Principal

High school
Kearny High School with 1,750 students in grades 9-12
Jacalyn Richardson, Principal

Haiti relief effort
On January 22, 2010, the entire school district held a "dress-down day" in an effort to raise money to help the Haitian people after suffering from the 2010 Haiti earthquake.  The students were allowed to wear whatever they wanted, and at their discrepancy they could and were encouraged to donate to those in need in Haiti.  The high school alone reported early on that they had raised over $6,500.  Shortly after, it was posted on the district website that in total, all seven schools were able to raise $29,000. All funds were donated to the Clinton Bush Haiti Fund.

Administration
Core members of the school administration are:Juan Faciolince
Patricia Blood, Superintendent of Schools
Juan Faciolince, Business Administrator/Board Secretary

Board of education
The district's board of education, comprised of nine members, sets policy and oversees the fiscal and educational operation of the district through its administration. As a Type II school district, the board's trustees are elected directly by voters to serve three-year terms of office on a staggered basis, with three seats up for election each year held (since 2012) as part of the November general election. The board appoints a superintendent to oversee the district's day-to-day operations and a business administrator to supervise the business functions of the district.

References

External links 
Kearny School District

School Data for the Kearny School District, National Center for Education Statistics

Kearny, New Jersey
New Jersey District Factor Group B
School districts in Hudson County, New Jersey